Jan Grønli (born August 18, 1950) is a Norwegian actor. From 1971 to 1991, Grønli was associated with the National Theater in Bergen, the Rogaland Theater, and the National Theater in Oslo. He was employed by the Norwegian Theater in 1991. He is considered Norway's foremost interpreter of Thomas Bernhard's plays.

Grønli has also read several audio books, including Epp by Axel Jensen and Ut og stjæle hester (Out Stealing Horses) by Per Petterson, as well as Jan Guillou's Crusades trilogy.

Filmography

 1973: Brannen as Jon
 1992: Svarte pantere as a fur farmer
 1992: Lakki as Buddha-Man
 1995: Farlig Farvann as Egil
 1996: Eremittkrepsen as the father
 1997: Hotel Oslo as Jon
 1997: 1996: Pust på meg as Thomas
 1998: Kineseren as the father
 2000: Aberdeen as Granbakken
 2000: De 7 dødssyndene - Fråtseri
 2001: Morgan Kane - Døden er en ensom jeger as Fyllikk
 2001: Olsenbandens første kupp as the principal
 2003: Jonny Vang as Uffe
 2003: Olsenbanden jr. går under vann as Major Schultze
 2004: Olsenbanden jr. på rocker'n as Pop-Johansen
 2005: Drømmen om Norge
 2005: Ved kongens bord as Anders Arnesen, minister of culture
 2006: En udødelig mann as Sigvald
 2006: Olsenbanden jr. på Cirkus as Sigvald Pettersen, the orphanage manager 
 2007: Olsenbanden Jr. og Sølvgruvens hemmelighet as Maximilian von Klem
 2009: Olsenbanden jr. Det sorte gullet as Engineer Hallandsen
 2010: Olsenbanden jr. Mestertyvens skatt as Arne
 2011: Arme riddere as Clausen

Voice roles

 1995: Dypets ensomhet as the narrator
 1998: Solan, Ludvig og Gurin med reverompa as coaching inn guest 2
 2000: 102 Dalmatinere as various voices
 2001: Operasjon Mjau
 2001: Atlantis: En forsvunnet verden
 2001: Småspioner 1
 2002: Istid as Carl
 2002: Hvalens sjel
 2003: Oppdrag Nemo as Brusk
 2005: Robots as Jack Hammer

Awards
 Hedda Award for outstanding stage performance for the role of Bruscon in Der Theatermacher by Thomas Bernhard at the National Theater in Oslo (2004)
 Aksel Waldemar memorial award (1994) 
 NRK Radio Theater's Blå fugl award (1995) 
 Aase Bye endowment (1997)
 Hulda Garborg award (2000)

References

External links
 

1950 births
20th-century Norwegian male actors
21st-century Norwegian male actors
Male actors from Oslo
Living people